Robert Austin Wynns, nicknamed Winnie (born December 10, 1990) is an American professional baseball catcher in the San Francisco Giants organization. He played college baseball at Fresno State University. He was drafted by the Baltimore Orioles in the tenth round of the 2013 Major League Baseball draft, and made his MLB debut with them in 2018.

Amateur career
Wynns attended Poway High School in Poway, California. In 2009, as a senior, he hit .390 with five home runs and 37 RBIs. That season he was named first team All-California Interscholastic Federation, and Player of the Year in the Palomar League.

After graduating and going undrafted in the 2009 MLB draft, Wynns enrolled and played college baseball at Fresno State University. In 2012, he played collegiate summer baseball with the Bourne Braves of the Cape Cod Baseball League. As a senior in 2013, he batted .279/.362/.413 with three home runs and 24 RBIs in 53 games. He was drafted by the Baltimore Orioles in the tenth round of the 2013 Major League Baseball draft.

Professional career

Baltimore Orioles
Wynns signed for $10,000, and spent 2013 with the Class A- Aberdeen IronBirds, posting a .235 batting average with 21 RBIs in 54 games.  On defense, he caught 37% of attempted base stealers. He was a 2013 NYP Mid-Season All-Star. In 2014, he played for both the Class A Delmarva Shorebirds and the Class A+ Frederick Keys, batting a combined .251 with one home run and 37 RBIs in 90 total games between the two teams. 

In 2015, Wynns played for Frederick and the Class AA Bowie Baysox, batting .281/.349/.390 with three home runs and 31 RBIs in 78 games. Wynns spent 2016 with Bowie, Frederick, and the Class AAA  Norfolk Tides, hitting .287/.336/.416 with six home runs and 34 RBIs in 80 games between the three clubs.  On defense, he caught 45.3% of attempted base stealers.

After the 2016 season, Wynns played in the Arizona Fall League for the Peoria Javelinas. He played the 2017 season with Bowie, batting .281/.377/.419 with 10 home runs and 46 RBIs in 105 games. On defense, he caught 38% of attempted base stealers. The Orioles added him to their 40-man roster after the 2017 season.

Wynns made his MLB debut on June 5, 2018. In 2018 with Baltimore he batted .255/.287/.382 in 118 plate appearances, while with Norfolk he batted .230/.288/.345 in 163 plate appearances.  He spent the majority of the 2019 season at Norfolk and Bowie, where he batted .266/.355/.342 with three home runs and 29 RBIs in 250 plate appearances, appearing in only 28 games with 74 plate appearances for the Orioles.  

Wynns did not appear in any games for the Orioles during the 2020 season, spending the entirety at the Orioles’ alternate training site. On December 7, 2020, Wynns was outrighted off of the 40-man roster.

On May 31, 2021, Wynns was selected to Baltimore's active roster. On June 12, Wynns hit his first career grand slam, off of Rich Hill of the Tampa Bay Rays. In 45 games and 139 plate appearances with Baltimore in 2021, Wynns batted .185/.232/.308 with four home runs and 14 RBIs.  In 59 plate appearances with the AAA Norfolk Tides, he hit .333/.448/.563 with three home runs and 9 RBIs.  Following the season, he elected free agency on October 25, 2021.

Philadelphia Phillies
On October 26, 2021, Wynns signed with the Toros de Tijuana of the Mexican League. However, on March 19, 2022, he signed a minor league contract with the Philadelphia Phillies.

In 2022 with the AAA Lehigh Valley IronPigs he batted .365/.504/.500 with 3 home runs and 20 RBIs in 134 plate appearances.

San Francisco Giants
The Phillies traded Wynns to the San Francisco Giants for Michael Plassmeyer on June 8, 2022. Wynns replaced rookie catcher Joey Bart, who was sent down to the Giants' Triple-A club. In 2022 with the Giants he batted .259/.313/.358 in 162 at bats, with three home runs and 21 RBIs while appearing in a career-high 65 games. He played 57 games at catcher, five at DH, and two as a relief pitcher. 

On January 6, 2023, Wynns was designated for assignment by San Francisco after the signing of Michael Conforto was made official. On January 12, Wynns was sent outright to the Triple-A Sacramento River Cats.

References

External links

1990 births
Living people
Baseball players from San Diego
Major League Baseball catchers
Baltimore Orioles players
San Francisco Giants players
Fresno State Bulldogs baseball players
Bourne Braves players
Aberdeen IronBirds players
Delmarva Shorebirds players
Frederick Keys players
Bowie Baysox players
Norfolk Tides players
Peoria Javelinas players
Toros del Este players
Leones del Escogido players
American expatriate baseball players in the Dominican Republic